Arthur James Donovan Jr. (June 5, 1924 – August 4, 2013), nicknamed "the Bulldog", was an American professional football player who was a defensive tackle for three National Football League (NFL) teams, most notably the Baltimore Colts. He was inducted into the Pro Football Hall of Fame in 1968.

Early life
Art Donovan, born June 5, 1924, was the son of Arthur Donovan Sr., a boxing referee, and the grandson of Professor Mike Donovan, the world middleweight boxing champion in the 1870s.

Art attended Mount Saint Michael Academy in the Bronx. He received a scholarship to the University of Notre Dame in 1942 but left after one semester to join the United States Marine Corps, enlisting in April 1943. He served four years, to include service in the Pacific Theatre during World War II. He took part in some of the conflict's fiercest engagements, such as the Battle of Luzon and the Battle of Iwo Jima. He also served as an ammo-loader on a 40mm gun on the aircraft carrier  and as a member of 3rd Marine Division. His earned citations, which included the Asiatic-Pacific Campaign Medal and the Philippine Liberation Medal, and would later earn him a place in the U.S. Marine Corps Sports Hall of Fame, the first pro football player so honored. After the war, he completed his college career at Boston College.

Professional football career
In each of his first three seasons, Donovan played for a team that went out of business. He started out with the first Baltimore Colts, which folded after his rookie season in 1950, followed by the New York Yanks in 1951, and their successor, the Dallas Texans, in 1952. After the Texans franchise folded, many of their players moved to Baltimore when the Colts were awarded a new franchise in 1953 and became the second Baltimore Colts, Donovan played with that team. He became one of the stars in an outstanding defense and was selected to five straight Pro Bowls, from 1953 through 1957. The Colts won back-to-back championships in 1958 and 1959. He was selected to the Pro Football Hall of Fame in 1968.

During his career, Donovan played in what many believe was one of the most important games in NFL history, the 1958 NFL Championship Game between the Colts and the New York Giants. The contest between the two teams took place on December 28, 1958, and ended in a 17–17 tie. Being the championship game, it went into overtime, the first NFL game to do so. Witnessed by 40 million viewers on nationwide television, the game came to be known as the "greatest game ever played." Donovan made an important tackle during the overtime, stopping the Giants and allowing Johnny Unitas to lead the Colts on an 80-yard scoring drive to win the game. Donovan was one of 12 Hall of Fame players to take part, six of whom were Colts.

Post-playing career

He published an autobiography, Fatso, in 1987. He was noted as a jovial and humorous person during his playing career and capitalized on that with television and speaking appearances after retiring as a player. He owned and managed a country club near Baltimore. Donovan also appeared ten times on Late Night with David Letterman, telling humorous stories about his old playing days and about other footballers he played with and against in his time. He relayed a story that he played without a helmet and in fact is shown on football cards without a helmet. Letterman wore Donovan's No. 70 Colts jersey in the famous Super Bowl XLI commercial with Oprah Winfrey and Jay Leno. Donovan also made several appearances on The Tonight Show Starring Johnny Carson.

Donovan guest-starred in the Nickelodeon show The Adventures of Pete & Pete in the episode "Space, Geeks, and Johnny Unitas". He also appeared as a guest commentator at the WWF King of the Ring tournament in 1994. Donovan's appearance at the event would become infamous among wrestling fans for being seemingly uninformed about the product as well as generally befuddled behavior such as repeatedly asking how much certain wrestlers weighed. He was joined by Gorilla Monsoon on play-by-play, who inadvertently referred to Donovan as "Art O'Donnell", and Randy Savage.

He was co-host of the popular 1990s program Braase, Donovan, Davis and Fans on WJZ-TV in Baltimore with Colt teammate Ordell Braase. The trio talked more about Art Donovan's fabled stories than contemporary NFL football, but the show held high ratings in its time slot. He was also a pitchman for the Maryland State Lottery and ESPN.

Achievements
 Played 12 seasons, 138 games
 Five-time consecutive Pro Bowl Selection (1953–1957)
 Four-time consecutive first-team All-Pro (1954–1957)
 First Colt to enter Pro Football Hall of Fame (1968)
 Member of 1958, 1959 NFL champion Baltimore Colts
 Began NFL play with Baltimore as a 26-year-old rookie (1950)
 Co-hosted the WWF's 1994 King of the Ring pay-per-view event
 U.S. Marine Corps Sports Hall of Fame (2004)

Personal
Donovan was married to the former Dorothy Schaech for 57 years. Since 1955 they owned and managed the Valley Country Club in Towson, Maryland. Although he was the owner, Donovan was known for doing menial labor at the club to include painting and working in the kitchen washing pots and pans.

Death and legacy
Donovan died August 4, 2013, at Stella Maris Hospice in Baltimore from a respiratory disease at age 89.  A funeral mass was held at the Cathedral of Mary our Queen in Baltimore, and he was buried in a private ceremony at Dulaney Valley Memorial Gardens. The Washington Post said of Donovan:

References

External links
 
 

1924 births
2013 deaths
American football defensive tackles
American Roman Catholics
United States Marine Corps personnel of World War II
Baltimore Colts players
Baltimore Colts (1947–1950) players
Boston College Eagles football players
Dallas Texans (NFL) players
Respiratory disease deaths in Maryland
New York Yanks players
Notre Dame Fighting Irish football players
Pro Football Hall of Fame inductees
Sportspeople from the Bronx
Players of American football from New York City
United States Marines
Western Conference Pro Bowl players
Burials at Dulaney Valley Memorial Gardens
National Football League players with retired numbers